A glossary of terms, commonly used in discussing pinball machines.

A
add-a-ball
(abbreviated AAB) a feature on some pinball machines that allows the player to earn additional balls by achieving a specific task. In modern machines, the add-a-ball feature often adds an additional ball into play during a multiball. Add-a-ball was first introduced in the 1960s to distinguish pinball machines from gambling devices by extending gameplay without allowing players to win additional credits. Unlike the extra ball feature, balls earned through add-a-ball on these machines are typically denoted on the game display by increasing the overall number of balls available. Additionally, a player can continue to earn additional balls via add-a-ball even if it has already been earned once from a ball in play or if the ball in play is itself an add-a-ball. Colloquially, machines that offer this feature are also called add-a-balls.

apron
A large attachment at the very bottom of the playfield, which covers the ball trough and often has inserts to display cards that explain the rules, scoring, or price. The front edges of the apron can form the lower edge of the playfield to lead the ball to the drain. This component is typically made of metal or plastic and can go by several names.

autosave
More commonly called ball save, every ball that goes down the drain will be returned to the plunger for a limited time. The amount of time that an autosave lasts varies from machine to machine and can be adjustable. Usually only available when starting with a new ball (to compensate for "unfair" very fast drains), it is also available during the start of multiballs on some later machines or as a reward for completing certain shots.

B
backbox
The vertical box that sits at the head of the pinball machine. It holds the backglass, electronics of the game, a digital game display, and may hold speakers. Some digital game displays include a Seven-segment display, DMD, or LCD. The backbox is also known as a lightbox or back rack.

backglass
 The upright glass panel in the  backbox, displaying the game's title and an illustration. The first backglass with lighted scoring appeared in 1935. Backglass production employs a  reverse glass printing technique, with layers of color  screen printed on the back of the glass, and can include unpainted sections to view displays for score or ball count. Backglass is a popular item among collectors for its artistic quality.

ball lock
On some machines, a progression of "ball locks" leads to a multiball. On older machines this refers to the physical mechanism that stores the balls on the playfield.

ball saver
See autosave.

ball search
On most solid state games, if no scoring activity is detected for a certain period of time, all moving components of the game will cycle in sequence in an effort to free any balls that may have become stuck.

banana flippers
Curved flipper bats found on Williams' Disco Fever and Time Warp games, shaped much like a banana.

bank
See drop target.

bonus (end-of-ball bonus)
One of the universal paradigms of pinball games is the end-of-ball bonus.  During play, certain shots and events can increase a bonus score or a multiplier, which is then applied to the player's score when the ball drains.  The rules for the ball bonus vary from game to game - some games simply increase the bonus during play, and some add scores from various in-game modes and counters (e.g. the number of door panels and hitchhikers collected in Twilight Zone).

bumper
An upright, typically cylindrical or rectangular area, that applies force to the ball when hit. The cylindrical variety is referred to as a mushroom bumper, when capped with a circular top, which usually lights up to show the points scored when the bumper is hit.
When flippers were introduced on Humpty Dumpty, they were referred to as "flipper bumpers"; this term is no longer used and "bumpers" never refers to "flippers".
Active bumpers are referred to as "jet bumpers" by WMS Industries and Midway Games (after the 1988 Williams-Midway merger), "pop bumpers" by Gottlieb, "thumper bumpers" by Bally Technologies (before the 1988 Williams-Midway merger) and "turbo bumpers" by Data East.

buy-in
Many modern pinball machines give the player the option to continue their game after the last standard ball has drained, usually at a cost of one credit.  Some games also keep a separate high-score table for games completed in this manner, so that "true" high scores are separated from ones that might be artificially increased through the use of extra credits.  These scores are usually displayed as "buy-in high scores".  Continuing the game sometimes also provides extra benefits, such as an extended ball-saver period or starting a mode automatically, to give the player an incentive to spend the extra credits.

C
cabinet
The main body of a pinball machine. Contains the playfield on top of all inner workings of the machine.

captive ball
A pinball trapped within a small area of the playfield.  The captive ball never leaves this area, and the free ball can never enter it.  However, the free ball can knock into the captive ball, which in turn can knock into targets in its area. Some tables even feature multiple stacked captive balls (e.g. Judge Dredd, Big Bang Bar), and some provide fixed balls as targets to trigger a moving captive ball (Theatre of Magic).

combo
Combo (or combo shot) refers to an immediate combination of different moves, often continuous ramp and/or orbit shots. Some machines, like Taxi, Theatre of Magic, and Demolition Man, reward combo shots by an increasing number of points, depending on the number of successful consecutive shots made.

conversion kit
Special equipment that can be used to transform one pinball table into another.

D
dead bumper
See Passive bumper.

DMD
A dot-matrix display is a pixel-addressable display used to display the score and other status during the game. Almost always placed in the backbox (exception: Cirqus Voltaire). Most machines released from 1992 onwards, starting with Data East's Checkpoint, released in 1991, feature this display. Some exceptions are the two VGA-driven Pinball 2000 series machines, pinball games that uses a LCD-display such as the machines from Jersey Jack Pinball and Heighway Pinball or retro style machines such as Whoa Nellie! Big Juicy Melons.

drain
The common term used to refer to the area beneath the flippers. If the ball rolls into the drain area via an outlane or between the flippers, it will be lost. Also refers to the act of losing a ball in this manner.

drop target
An upright, pressure-sensitive rectangle that drops below the playfield when hit by the ball. Drop targets are often arranged in so-called banks, and may require being hit in combination or in sequence to score or light special features.

E
electro-mechanical (EM)
A pinball machine design that relies on relays, motors and switches to run.  This design was phased out in the late 1970s.  EM machines are easily recognized by their scoring displays that have mechanical score reels that spin to show the score.   Newer machines are referred to as solid state (SS).

extra ball
An additional bonus ball that can be earned by achieving a specific task.

F
flipper
A tapered bat, typically found in pairs at the bottom of the table, that is the player's primary means of controlling the ball. Normally a downward slope extending the bottom structure of the table, one end is moved upward in an arc when the player taps the appropriate button.

flipper button
A pushbutton which is pushed by players to control the flipper. Typically one on each side of the cabinet.

G
GI
An acronym of general illumination, this refers to the lights on the playfield used simply to make the playfield visible in a dark room. Also known as street lighting.

gobble hole
A hole in a pinball table that ends the game or the current ball if the ball falls in it. On most games with this feature, the gobble hole will be lit for a special and/or a large number of points once some other in-game objective has been completed. One game with this feature is Slick Chick.

H
habitrail

A wireform path for the ball to travel in a straight line.  May consist of either two wires on the bottom, or four wires to fully enclose the ball.

hurry-up mode
An optional side mode in which the player is challenged to complete a task within a brief time limit to earn bonus points. Traditionally, hurry-ups start with a large point value, which rapidly decreases over several seconds; completing the task stops the countdown and awards its value. Another common variant is to use a hurry-up to determine the shot value of a mode that starts immediately afterward, where it can be collected multiple times.

I
inlane
 The inside lane of the pinball machine. See "lane" for more information.

J
jackpot
A specially designated point bonus; typically among the highest amounts that can be scored with one shot. In earlier games (mid-late 80s), scoring the Jackpot was the ultimate goal of the game, requiring the player to complete a precise and difficult set of tasks to score it. The Jackpot would continue to build slowly over many games until it was scored. More modern games simply call any multiball shot award a "jackpot" and the values are more downplayed.

K
kickback
A launching mechanism located inside an outlane that saves the ball from being drained if it falls in there.  Kickbacks are usually disabled at the start of a session and can be activated as a reward during play, although there are some exceptions, like the virtual table 3D Pinball Space Cadet.   Most tables tend to utilize only one kickback and leave one outlane unprotected for increased difficulty and revenue.

kickout hole
A depression in the pinball table that the ball can fall into.  This is usually just large enough for the ball to fit into it.  After gaining some points, and/or adjusting the game state, the ball is kicked back into play in a predictable direction and speed.

L
lane
A lane is in general any area of the table just wide enough to let the ball pass through. Special kinds of lanes are inlanes and outlanes; both types are situated at the bottom of the playing field. The outlanes are at the far ends and connect to the bottom (causing loss of the ball), the inlanes are next to them and connect to the flipper area.

M
magic post
A post that can rise up between the flipper fingers and completely block the middle drain. Sometimes also called a recovery post or up post.

magna-save
A feature that allows the player to activate a magnet located just below the entrance to an outlane. A ball headed for the outlane will be held by the magnet and diverted to the corresponding inlane instead. Williams Electronics pioneered this feature on the Black Knight game.

match
The chance to win a free game after the last ball has drained. On most machines the free game is received when the last two digits of the score match a pseudo randomly picked two digit number. The winning chance can be altered by the operator. Most modern games incorporate a short animated skit that culminates in the match number selection.

mode
A configuration of the table where specific goals must be met in a limited time to score points, hitting specific lanes or dropping specific targets, sometimes combined with multiball. Some tables have multiple modes that must be activated in order, usually building up to an "ultimate" last mode or the wizard mode where the most points can be scored.

multiball (multi-ball)
A situation where a series of balls are shot onto the playfield. Multiballs are either a mode that can be selected by the gamer, or can be triggered in the pinball machine that forces the other balls to roll on the playfield.

O
orbit
A path for the ball that hugs the outer rim of the game.  Orbits generally have a slingshot effect; sending the ball into an orbit generally means it returns immediately from another.  Orbits are generally named for the side of the playfield on which the ball enters (e.g. the "left orbit" means the ball enters the orbit on the left side and travels to the right).

outlane
See lane. The outlanes are generally the outside lanes at the sides of the playfield that lead the ball to the drain (sometimes with a possibility of striking a peg and re-entering the adjacent inlane).

P
passive bumper
A bumper which does not kick the ball when hit, although it may register a score or play a sound effect. Also known as a dead bumper.

peg
A small, stationary vertical post with a rubber ring, designed to deflect the ball away from sensitive parts and to reject poorly-aimed shots.  Some games place a peg between the flippers, giving the ball a chance to bounce away from the drain and back onto the flippers (see also "magic post" and "stopper").

playfield
The main flat surface of the game, on which targets, ramps, orbits, flippers and bumpers are arranged.  "Playfield" refers both to the surface itself and to the overall play area (to distinguish it from other parts of the machine such as the backbox).  The ball rolls along this surface.  Many games refer to the "lower" playfield (nearest the player) and the "upper" playfield (nearest the backbox).  In some cases, this distinction is more literal, as in the separate, vertically-arranged playfield levels in Black Knight 2000.

plunger
A player-controlled, spring-loaded rod that allows the player to send the ball into the game. The plunger is usually located at the bottom right corner of the pinball machine.

popper
A device that launches the ball vertically, often to a raised playfield.

R
ramp
A section of the playfield with a raised gradient.  Ramps generally lead either to raised playfields or to inlanes.

replay
A free game received after a certain score is reached.

rollover
A flat switch residing in the playfield itself.  A rollover is activated when the ball rolls over it.

S
scoop/saucer
A hole that catches the ball.

score motor
A motor in an EM pinball cabinet used primarily to ensure that score reels are updated correctly.  It activates relays repeatedly until a specific task is completed.  Also known as a "cam timer".

shooter lane
The lane which leads from the trough/plunger to the playfield  (see also: lane.)

skill shot
A bonus awarded to the player for completing a specific task when releasing the ball.  Most games that include skill shots require the player to either plunge the ball with just the right amount of force to hit a specific target, or to make a specific shot with the flippers as the first shot once the ball is on the playfield.  (Not to be confused with "combo shot".)

slam tilt
This particular form of tilt is given if the machine is nudged with such violence that it risks damaging the hardware.  Such an action generally sounds an alarm and causes the machine to reset, ending ALL players' games in progress (hence voiding the credit).  A slam tilt is sometimes also given if force is applied to the coin box.

sling shot
The triangular objects on either side of the flippers that propel the ball toward the opposite side.

special
Some machines allow the player to earn a free game (called a special in that context) by achieving a specific task (e.g. lighting all monsters and their instruments in Monster Bash).

spinner
A target that is on the playfield and when hit by the ball, rotates.

standup target (stand-up target, spot target)
A standing target on a playfield, similar to a drop target, but which does not drop into the playfield when struck.

stopper
A small metal post, often with a rubber ring, typically found between and slightly below the bottom flippers.  If the ball hits the post, it will bounce up and away, saving it from draining. Skilled players can use the stopper to make trick shots. On some tables, the stopper is made available only as a reward.  (See also: peg, magic post)

subway
A track underneath the playfield that moves the ball from one spot on the playfield to another. Usually the ball drops into a hole, and is then ejected from the subway back onto the playfield by a solenoid.

T
target
Mechanical switches which are activated by the ball to earn points, light indicators, and/or advance the game. (see also Drop target or standup target. 

tilt
The tilt mechanism detects when the machine is being lifted, tilted or shaken beyond an acceptable level.  Originally designed to prevent players from lifting the front of the machine to cause balls to roll backwards, it also helps prevent damage to the machine's hardware, body and legs by discouraging players from shaking the machine too hard. When the mechanism is triggered, the machine "tilts", ending play for the current ball and usually forfeiting any bonuses earned (if it's the last ball, and the player has no extra balls left, the game is automatically over). Most modern games provide a configurable number of warnings per ball before tilting.  Some older games would void the entire game upon tilt.

topper
An extra decoration that sits on top of the backbox of the machine that is typically an extension of the theme of the game.  Early toppers were simple signs but by the 1980’s they would illuminate or would move in sync with events in the game.  Some modern toppers will light up with progress in the game and can unlock levels.

toy
Many pinball machines have unique objects on or above the playfield to enhance the theme of the game.  They are called "toys" mainly because they often resemble children's toys and are specific to the machine in question.  Some directly impact gameplay, while others are non-interactive or purely cosmetic.  For example, Twilight Zone features two significant toys: The gumball machine (which stores and releases balls), and a working analog clock (which is used to show the time remaining in various game modes).  Another example of a gameplay-affecting toy is the spinning soccer ball in World Cup Soccer.

translight
The plastic or glass sheet in the backbox, generally displaying the game's main illustration on a translucent piece of printed plastic, allowing light to pass through.  Also called the "backglass".  The term "translight" (or "translite") usually refers more specifically to the printed plastic in modern pinball games using dot-matrix displays, since those displays are mounted underneath the glass, not behind it, allowing the artwork to be one single unmodified sheet.

U
up post
See magic post.

up-kicker
An electro-mechanical feature that physically propels the ball upwards onto a second-tier playfield, as used in Gottlieb's Haunted House.

V
vari-target
A target that can be moved by the ball by a varying amount. Normally this directly corresponds to the number of points received, as it is usually risky trying to shoot the narrow target with full force.

Vitrigraph
Gottlieb's patented photo-realistic mylar overlay for pinball playfields rather than the industry standard silk screen on the wood.

VUK
Short for vertical up-kicker.  Synonym for popper.

W
wedge head
Trapezoidal shaped cabinet backboxes when viewed from the front.

widebody
Widebody pinball machines offer more playfield space and more to be packed in but are more expensive

wizard mode (wizard bonus)
A special mode or bonus, started only after completing a long and difficult series of tasks in a pinball machine.  The first wizard bonus was the "king's ransom" in 1989's Black Knight 2000. As rulesets have gotten more complicated, many modern games offer smaller "mini-wizard" modes as challenging tasks for intermediate players.

woodrail
Pinball machines manufactured prior to appr. 1961 that used wood to frame the playfield glass.

See also
 List of pinball machines
 List of pinball manufacturers

References

External links
Pinball Glossary of The Internet Pinball Machine Database

Pinball
Glossary
Wikipedia glossaries using description lists